Sichuan Dragons (四川蛟龙) is a baseball team based in Chengdu, Sichuan and a member of the China Baseball League since 2005. They play out of 2,000-capacity Jinnui Stadium.

Roster
Pitchers
Kun Chen
Bo Zhao
Infielders
Fei Feng, SS

References

Baseball in China
Sport in Sichuan